The life stage at which a fungus lives, grows, and develops, gathering nutrients and energy. 

The fungus uses this stage to proliferate itself through asexually created mitotic spores.

Cycles through somatic hyphae, zoosporangia, zoospores, encystation & germination, and back to somatic hyphae.

References
C.J. Alexopolous, Charles W. Mims, M. Blackwell, Introductory Mycology, 4th ed. (John Wiley and Sons, Hoboken NJ, 2004)  

Fungal morphology and anatomy